David Jeffrey Griffiths (born December 5, 1942) is an American physicist and educator.  He worked at Reed College from 1978 through 2009, becoming the Howard Vollum Professor of Science before his retirement.

Biography
Griffiths is a graduate of The Putney School and was trained at Harvard University (B.A., 1964; M.A., 1966; Ph.D., 1970).  His doctoral work Covariant Approach to Massless Field Theory in the Radiation Gauge on theoretical particle physics was supervised by Sidney Coleman.  He is principally known as the author of three highly regarded textbooks for undergraduate physics students:  Introduction to Elementary Particles (published in 1987, second edition published 2008), Introduction to Quantum Mechanics (published in 1995, third edition published 2018), and Introduction to Electrodynamics (published in 1981, fourth edition published in 2012).

Awards, honors 
He was the recipient of the 1997 Robert A. Millikan award reserved for "those who have made outstanding scholarly contributions to physics education". 

In 2009 he was named a Fellow of the American Physical Society, cited "For advancing the upper level physics curriculum through the writing of leading textbooks and through his contributions to the American Journal of Physics in many editorial roles and as an author."

Books

The most recent edition of each book is generally regarded as a standard undergraduate text.

See also 

 John David Jackson

References

External links
Griffiths's web page
Lecture: The charge distribution on a conductor
"... could teach physics to gerbils."

David Griffiths Lecture, Techfest 2012, IIT Bombay - YouTube

1942 births
Living people
Harvard University alumni
Reed College faculty
21st-century American physicists
Particle physicists
Fellows of the American Physical Society
American people of Welsh descent
The Putney School alumni
Physics educators